Remke van Veelen (1978) is a Dutch fiction writer. She writes for the Dutch brand of Sesame Street. She works as a commissioning editor for the publisher Eenvoudig Communiceren.

Bibliography
June 2002 saw the appearance of Van Veelens debut novel Ellen Ellen with publisher Vassallucci.

Excerpt: Wat er gaat gebeuren weet ik niet. Ik heb het gevoel dat er wel eens iemand op mij zou kunnen wachten.

Life

Education 
Remke van Veelen followed an education for writers at the Hogeschool voor de Kunsten Utrecht.

External links 
remke van veelen — google plus
publisher — communicate simple → who we are
http://www.bol.com/nl/p/ellen-ellen/1001004001647581/

References

1978 births
Living people
Dutch-language writers